Red Jack, redjack, or variation, may refer to:

People
 Jack the Ripper, of the Whitechapel murders, 19th century serial killer also nicknamed "Red Jack"

 Jack Beattie (ice hockey) (1906-1981; aka Red Jack Beattie) UK ice hockey player
 Red Jack Ellsmore (1859-1931), a captain of the Kulshan (steamship)
 Jack Keating (1916-1951; aka Red Jack Keating) Canadian ice hockey player
 Red Jack Heavenridge, U.S. basketball player, member of the 1930s ICC AllStars
 Red Jack Lamberton, American football player, member of the 1915 College Football All-America Team
 John McMartin (Canadian politician) (1858-1918; aka Red Jack McMartin)
 Red Jack Murray (1884-1958) U.S. baseball player
 Red Jack Teehan (hurler), great-grandfather of Brian Carroll (hurler)

Fictional characters
 Redjac, a Star Trek character from the episode "Wolf in the Fold", named after Jack the Ripper
 Redjack, a fictional character from the 1998 videogame Redjack: Revenge of the Brethren
 Redjack, a fictional character from the 1996 TV cartoon Project G.e.e.K.e.R.
 Redjack, a fictional character from the comic book Bucky O'Hare; see List of Bucky O'Hare characters
 Red Jack Stillwell, a fictional character from the telefilm The Tracker (1988 film)
 Red Jack Taylor Jr., a fictional character from the 2003 film My Boss's Daughter
 Red Jack (DC Comics), a comic book supervillain, named after Jack the Ripper; see List of Doom Patrol enemies
 Red Jack, a fictional character from the 1991 anime cartoon Armored Police Metal Jack

Flags
 A red ensign flag of the British Empire
 A red jack version of the Flag of France
 A red jack version of the French ensign

Other uses
 Red jack (Caranx ruber), a fish found on the U.S. Atlantic seaboard
 A jack (playing card) from a red suit in cards, the jack of hearts and jack of diamonds
 Redjack: Revenge of the Brethren, a 1998 videogame
 Redjack Island, a fictional location from the videogame Redjack: Revenge of the Brethren
 Battlebook: Redjack (comic book), a 2018 comic by Geoffrey Thorne
 "Red Jack", a 1951 episode of the TV Western The Range Rider
 Red Jack Gang (1880s), an Old West gang, see List of Old West gangs

See also

 Jack red, the red colour of the Union Jack and the red ensign
 Jack the Ripper (disambiguation)
 Jack of Diamonds (disambiguation)
 Jack of Hearts (disambiguation)
 Black Jack (disambiguation)
 Jack (disambiguation)
 Red (disambiguation)